Daniel Gwynne Jones (born 27 July 1981) is a British historian, TV presenter, and journalist. He was educated at The Royal Latin School, a state grammar school in Buckingham, before attending Pembroke College, Cambridge.

Early life and education
Jones was born in Reading, England, in 1981 to Welsh parents. He was educated at The Royal Latin School, a state grammar school in Buckingham, before attending Pembroke College, Cambridge, where he achieved a first-class degree in History in 2002.

Career

Historian
Dan Jones' first history book was a popular narrative history of the English Peasants' Revolt of 1381, titled Summer of Blood: The Peasants' Revolt of 1381, which was published in 2009.

His second book, The Plantagenets: The Kings Who Made England, was published in 2012 in the United Kingdom and a year later in the United States, where it became a New York Times bestseller. The book, which covers the history of the Plantagenet dynasty from Henry II to Richard II, received positive reviews from critics.

Jones' third book, The Hollow Crown: The Wars of the Roses and the Rise of the Tudors published in 2014, picks up where The Plantagenets leaves off and covers the period 1420–1541, from the death of Henry V to the execution of Henry VIII's cousin, Margaret Pole. His fourth book, also published in 2014 is about the Magna Carta and is titled Magna Carta: The Making and Legacy of the Great Charter.

Jones' next book, The Templars, The Rise and the Spectacular Fall of God's Holy Warriors, was published in September 2017 about the Knights Templar. Jones also worked as historical consultant on the 2018 History historical drama Knightfall, also presenting the official podcast.

In August 2018, he published The Colour of Time: A New History of the World, 1850–1960 illustrated by Marina Amaral. He collaborated with Amaral again in 2020 for the book The World Aflame. Crusaders: The Epic History of the Wars for the Holy Land was published on 5 September 2019. It deals with the Crusades from 1096 onwards. Powers and Thrones: A New History of the Middle Ages was published by Head of Zeus in 2021.

His first historical fiction debut began with his 2022 book Essex Dogs which is part of a planned trilogy. It details the life of a platoon of archers and men-at-arms during the Hundred Years' War.

TV presenter
In 2014, Jones' book The Plantagenets was adapted for television as a four-part series on Channel 5 entitled Britain's Bloodiest Dynasty: The Plantagenets.

Jones has also made a twelve-part series for Channel 5, Secrets of Great British Castles.

In April 2016 he co-wrote and co-presented, with Suzannah Lipscomb, Henry VIII and His Six Wives, shown on Channel 5.

In May 2017 he co-wrote and co-presented a three-part docu-drama, Elizabeth I, with Suzannah Lipscomb. It was broadcast on Channel 5.

In May and June 2017, Jones, with Suzannah Lipscomb and engineer Rob Bell, presented The Great Fire, for Channel 5, a series in which the three presenters walked the actual route the Great Fire of London fire took across the city.

In June 2018 he presented a three-part series for Channel 5, Building Britain's Canals.

Jones has also made a four-part documentary series entitled Britain's Bloody Crown about the Wars of the Roses.

Over four weeks in March 2019, Jones presented London: 2,000 years of history alongside Lipscomb and Bell.

Journalist
Jones is a journalist. He is a columnist at the London Evening Standard, where he writes regularly about sport. He has written for The Times, the Sunday Times, The Telegraph, The Spectator, The Daily Beast and Newsweek, The Literary Review, The New Statesman, GQ, BBC History Magazine and History Today.

Personal life
Dan Jones is the great-nephew of British politician and journalist Alun Gwynne Jones, Baron Chalfont. He lives in Staines-upon-Thames with his wife, two daughters and son.

Publications
 Summer of Blood: The Peasants' Revolt of 1381, London, HarperPress, 2009, .
 The Plantagenets: The Kings Who Made England, London, HarperPress, 2012, 
 The Hollow Crown: The Wars of the Roses and the Rise of the Tudors, London, Faber, 2014, ; also published as: The Wars of the Roses: The Fall of the Plantagenets and the Rise of the Tudors, New York, Viking, 2014,  
 Magna Carta: The Making and Legacy of the Great Charter, London, Head of Zeus, 2014, ; also published as: Magna Carta: The Birth of Liberty, New York, Viking, 2014 
 The Templars: The Rise and Spectacular Fall of God's Holy Warriors, London, Head of Zeus, 2017, .
 The Colour of Time: A New History of the World, 1850–1960, London, Apollo, 2018, .
 Crusaders: The Epic History of the Wars for the Holy Land, London, Head of Zeus, 2019
 The World Aflame: The Long War, 1914–1945, London, Apollo, 2020, .
 Powers and Thrones: A New History of the Middle Ages, London, Head of Zeus, 2021, .

Filmography

References

1981 births
Living people
writers from Reading, Berkshire
Alumni of Pembroke College, Cambridge
People educated at the Royal Latin School
21st-century English historians
English male journalists
English biographers
Historians of England
English television presenters
Male biographers